The 1993 Fresno State Bulldogs football team represented California State University, Fresno as a member of the Western Athletic Conference (WAC) during the 1993 NCAA Division I-A football season. Led by 16th-year head coach Jim Sweeney, Fresno State compiled an overall record of 8–4 with a mark of 6–2 in conference play, sharing the WAC title with BYU and Wyoming. The Bulldogs played their home games at Bulldog Stadium in Fresno, California.

Fresno State was invited to the Aloha Bowl, where they lost to No. 17 Colorado, 41–30.

Schedule

Team players in the NFL
The following were selected in the 1994 NFL Draft.

The following finished their college career in 1993, were not drafted, but played in the NFL.

References

Fresno State
Fresno State Bulldogs football seasons
Western Athletic Conference football champion seasons
Fresno State Bulldogs football